East Air was a privately owned airline based in Qurghonteppa, Tajikistan. The airline operated regular flights from Qurghonteppa and Kulob to Russia. In October 2014 the Tajikistan General Authority of Civil Aviation revoked East Air's Air Operator's Certificate (AOC) and the airline went out of business.

Destinations 
As of July 2013 East Air served following destinations:

Asia

Bishkek - Manas International Airport

Dushanbe - Dushanbe International Airport
Kulob - Kulob Airport
Qurghonteppa - Qurghonteppa International Airport

Europe

Kazan - Kazan International Airport
Moscow - Moscow Domodedovo Airport
Novosibirsk - Tolmachevo Airport
Chelyabinsk - Balandino Airport
Orenburg - Orenburg Tsentralny Airport
Saint Petersburg - Pulkovo Airport
Yekaterinburg - Koltsovo Airport

Fleet 
The East Air fleet consisted entirely of Boeing 737 and Airbus A320 aircraft (as of May 2014):

References

External links

East Air Official Site 

Defunct airlines of Tajikistan
Airlines disestablished in 2014
2014 disestablishments in Tajikistan
Airlines established in 2007